Juma Mosque of Nakhchivan or Friday Mosque of Nakhchivan – is one of monumental constructions of the Atabegs’ Architectural Complex in Nakhchivan, Azerbaijan. The architectural monument demolished in the 20th century is documented in images and photos from the 19th century. 

Like the Marand and Urmia mosques, there were two lancet arches in walls of the Friday Mosque in Nakhchivan, although the southern wall of its cubic trunk was covered with a cupola. This shows that a new local type of mosque was created and developed in the centre of Azerbaijan in the 12th century. According to photo documents, all three sides of the masqura of the mosque were surrounded with columns. But there is no information about their appearance. According to V.A.Engelguard: 

It can therefore be considered that the arch with two minarets is connected to the Friday mosque with cells and a columned gallery and it is opened to the yard of the mosque. From historical sources, it is known that there was a madrasa in the Atabegs’ Architectural complex. There is no doubt that this madrasa had a direct connection with Friday mosque. It is considered that the arch with two-minarets was the arch of the yard where are collected religious constructions of the Atabegs’ complex.

If the first constructions of the Atabegs’ Complex were the palace and divan, then the last construction was the arch which has been documented only in photos. The scientist of oriental studies N.Khanikov saw this arch in the 19th century and from a ligature located on its door read that "It was ordered to construct the mosque in 1187, by amir Nureddin – leader of the cavalry and tax collector of the Atabeys’ state of Azerbaijan". That ligature was finished with "Ajami Nakhchivani’s work" words. The great entrance arch was surrounded with short and tall arches and there were minarets with cylindrical trunks at the edges of proportional formed arch covered with ligature boom. This monument of Nakhchivan which has one of the first arches in such a shape is evidence of the highest level achieved by the Azerbaijani religious architecture of the mid-11th and 12th centuries. Such a composition of the arch became the main architectural method in a lot of Islamic countries in the next centuries.

References

Monuments and memorials in Azerbaijan
Buildings and structures in the Nakhchivan Autonomous Republic
Mosques in Azerbaijan
Nakhchivan
Ajami Nakhchivani buildings and structures